Freda James and Kay Stammers were the defending champions, but lost in the quarterfinals to Phyllis King and Elsie Pittman.

Simonne Mathieu and Billie Yorke defeated King and Pittman in the final, 6–3, 6–3 to win the ladies' doubles tennis title at the 1936 Wimbledon Championships.

Seeds

  Freda James /  Kay Stammers (quarterfinals)
  Simonne Mathieu /  Billie Yorke (champions)
  Helen Jacobs /  Hilde Sperling (third round)
  Evelyn Dearman /  Joan Ingram (semifinals)

Draw

Finals

Top half

Section 1

Section 2

The nationality of Miss E Homan is unknown.

Bottom half

Section 3

The nationalities of Mrs AL Semmence, Mrs GA Myers and Audrey Richardson are unknown.

Section 4

References

External links

Women's Doubles
Wimbledon Championship by year – Women's doubles
Wimbledon Championships - Doubles
Wimbledon Championships - Doubles